Mundadugu is a 1983 Indian Telugu-language drama film produced by D. Rama Naidu of Suresh Productions and directed by K. Bapaiah, starring Krishna, Sobhan Babu, Sridevi and Jaya Prada.

It is remade in Hindi language in 1984 as Maqsad.

Plot
Gummadi and Sivakrishna are brothers. Sivakrishna is a socialist and wants to spend the property for the poor, whereas Gummadi is a very selfish man. Their differences lead to the death of Sivakrishna as planned by Raogopal Rao, Allu and Chalapati Rao. Chakravarthi (Sobhan Babu) is the son of Gummadi and Tilak (Krishna) is the son of Sivakrishna. Tilak joins as a worker in the company of Gummadi. Jaya Prada is the niece of Gummadi and she falls in love with Tilak. Chakravarthi loves Sridevi, daughter of a teacher in their company. The villains have issues with Tilak. The resulting conflict between Chakravarthi and Tilak finally leads to the revelation of their relationship and a happy ending.

Cast
 Krishna as Balagangadhara Tilak
 Shobhan Babu as Chakravarthi
 Sridevi as Bharati 
 Jaya Prada as Rani
 Kaikala Satyanarayana as Kamaraju
 Rao Gopal Rao as Phanibhushan Rao
 Allu Ramalingaiah as Bhujangam
 Sivakrishna  as father of Balagangadhar Tilak
 Giribabu as Lingamurthy
 Chalapathi Rao as Nagendra
 Rajendra Prasad as Mohan
 Gummadi as Dharma Rao
 Nutan Prasad as Dasu
 Suryakantham as wife of Bhujangam
 Annapoorna as Sharada
 M. Prabhakar Reddy as Vishnumurthy
 Raavi Kondala Rao as Sarma
 Sakshi Ranga Rao
 Radha Kumari as mother of Rani
 Narra Venkateswara Rao as Inspector

Soundtrack

Box office
The film ran for more than 50 days in all the released centers. It also ran for more than 100 days and celebrated Silver Jubilee.

References

External links
 

1983 films
Telugu films remade in other languages
Indian action drama films
Films with screenplays by the Paruchuri brothers
Films directed by K. Bapayya
Films scored by K. Chakravarthy
1980s Telugu-language films
1980s action drama films
Suresh Productions films